Avalon School is a K-12 school in Avalon, California on Santa Catalina Island, 26 miles off the coast of California. The school is a part of the Long Beach Unified School District.  A remote one-room school house, Two Harbors Elementary located 18 miles (an hour's bus ride) away at The Isthmus, closed in 2014 due to low enrollment.

References

High schools in Long Beach, California
High schools in Los Angeles County, California
Public high schools in California
Educational institutions established in 1924
1924 establishments in California